Kazhukan is a 1979 Indian Malayalam-language film,  directed by A. B. Raj. The film stars Jayan, Shubha, Sukumaran and Jagathy Sreekumar . The film has musical score by M. K. Arjunan. Sukumaran plays the antagonist. The film was a remake of the 1978 Kannada/Tamil bilingual Thappida Thala / Thappu Thalangal, directed by K. Balachander.

Cast

Jayan as Velu
Shubha as Malathi
Sukumaran as Gopi
Jagathy Sreekumar
Sreelatha Namboothiri
Paul Vengola
Bahadoor
Ceylon Manohar
Kundara Johny
Philomina
Priya
Varalakshmi
Jameela Malik
Pushpa
Vazhoor Rajan

Soundtrack
The music was composed by M. K. Arjunan and the lyrics were written by Sreekumaran Thampi.

References

External links

External links
 kazhukan

1979 films
1970s Malayalam-language films
Malayalam remakes of Kannada films
Malayalam remakes of Tamil films
Films with screenplays by K. Balachander
Films directed by A. B. Raj